State Highway 9 (SH 9) is a State Highway in Kerala, India that starts in Kanjikuzhi and ends in Kozhencherry. The highway connects Kottayam and Pathanamthitta districts. The highway is 44.4 km long.

Route description 
Kanjikuzhi - Puthupally - Karukachal  - Mallappally junction - Vennikulam- Pullad (Overlaps T.K. Road / SH 7) - Kozhencherry

Townships on the State Highway 
 Puthuppally : Manarcadu - Thenganal Road crosses
 Karukachal : Changanassery - Vazhoor Road crosses
 Mallappally 
 Kozhenchery

See also 
 Roads in Kerala
 List of State Highways in Kerala

References 

State Highways in Kerala
Roads in Pathanamthitta district
Roads in Kottayam district